Cabalum Western College is a non-sectarian, stock institution of higher learning in Iloilo City, Iloilo, Philippines established by Dr. Jose Cabalum Sr.

History
On October 5, 1945, immediately after World War II, the National Business School was established by Dr. Jose Cabalum Sr. He felt a calling from God to help the country rehabilitate by helping the young prepare themselves for their future with a proper education. The National Business School started with a single typewriter, a couple of tables and a few chairs. The founder was helped by two associates, Ceferino Lañada and Urbano Garrido. The college offered courses in Stenography, Typewriting and Bookkeeping. It was the first school to acquire permit on its courses, considering all vocational schools in Iloilo City.

In July 1949, the administration decided to offer secondary commercial course in line with its extension program. Later, the name National Business School was changed to Cabalum Commercial School, due to the advice of Bureau of Private School. In 1962, the school got third place in the National Examination for Public and Private Schools. In 1963, the Secondary Commercial Course was abolished to specialize in Collegiate Secretarial and Business Education. In January 1982, Cabalum Commercial School applied with the Ministry of Education, Culture and Sports for a permit to offer complete four-year degree program in Bachelor of Science in Secretarial Administration (BSSA). The permit was issued in October 1984 and became effective in March 1985. On the same year, Cabalum Commercial School was awarded as the "Outstanding Pioneer Business School" by Iloilo Chamber of Commerce and Industry, for having served and answered the need for vocational training among the youth for many years.

The college has been offering complete program on Bachelor of Science in Business Administration (BSBA) and Bachelor of Science in Secretarial Administration (BSSA) and with additional vocational courses. The request for change of name was granted, and the corporate name was changed to Cabalum Western College Inc. To keep abreast with the demand of technical advancement and development, Cabalum Western College offered Bachelor of Science in Computer Science (BSCS) starting school year 1992. Likewise, it offered Bachelor of Science in Secretarial Administration course with majors in Science and Data Processing under Bachelor of Science in Business Administration course. Since 1996, the college has been offering a five-year program in the Bachelor of Science in Computer Engineering (BSCoE).

Ideals
Cabalum Western College is an academic institution that had encountered significant transition since its humble beginning and the college continues to exist embodying the three ideals: scholarship, character, and service.

Present times
Cabalum Western College is located exactly at the heart of the city, along the Dr. Fermin Caram Sr., Avenue in Iloilo City. It has a total land area of 1,812sq. m., with three buildings, 31 classrooms, and air-conditioned laboratories with tools and equipment needed by the students. Another room was under renovation for the opening of new course, Bachelor of Science in Hotel and Restaurant Management this school year.

On October 2–5, 2006, the Cabalum Western College celebrated its 61st Foundation Day with the theme "The Founder's Legacy." The week of activities was dedicated to Dr. Jose Cabalum Sr., who died on August 18, 2006. It showcased talents, creativity and intelligence of the students and their teachers.

Cabalum Western College is affiliated with PSITE, CEAS-WV, AUCSI, PACSB, PAEOA and PACU. The Commission on Higher Education (CHED) and Technical Education and Skills Development Authority (TESDA) also recognize the Cabalum Western College as it offers bachelor's degree and Technical/Vocational courses.

The college trains students intellectually, physically, emotionally and spiritually. The students were active members of Red Cross Iloilo Chapter, Campus Paper Writers of Region VI-Western Visayas and Campus Ministry Iloilo Chapter. Cabalum Western College allows its students to have on-the-job training with companies in Western Visayas with work related to their field. Every year, the graduating students of Computer Engineering and Computer Science go to Manila for their education tour and training at more sophisticated IT companies where they can have hands-on practice. The undergrad students have their Annual Seminar-Workshop at college with experts and experienced guest speakers.

Cabalum Western College is concerned with the intellectual, social, moral, physical and spiritual needs of the individual through scholarship, the development of character, and the promotion of service among its students. It strives to turn out graduates who are responsible, God-fearing citizens, proud of their culture, law-abiding, and prepared to do their share in national and international development.

The college, the administration, the faculty, and staff is continually improving to give the students the best and the most effective way of teaching.

Flagship courses
At first, Cabalum Western College offered courses in Stenography, Typewriting and Bookkeeping. But due to the overwhelming demand for IT (Information Technology) specialists, the college now offers different computer-based bachelor's degree and Technical/Vocational courses. This is the only college in town which offers ladderized courses. Graduating students were required to render On-the-job training (OJT) with the different top IT Companies in the region related to their courses.

Bachelor of Science in Computer Engineering (BSCoE) trained the students to be innovative in the future. Computer-Aided Design and Hardware-Software interfacing was part of their trainings to prepare them to be one of the top inventors of the world. The graduating students need to pass their oral and written defense with the invited panelist before they can graduate. A latest trend of interfacing was done particularly in the field of robotics.

Two-year Computer Technician Course is part of the ladder of Computer Engineering course. This year the students were trained to understand how electricity and electronics work.

Bachelor of Science in Computer Science (BSCS) trains the students on the software world. Every now and then, new software is introduced and the students are abruptly taught and specifically apply it in their work as they graduate.

Bachelor of Science in Business Administration (BSBA) with majors in Management, Finance and Management Accounting prepare students to be part of the corporate world.

Two-Year Associate in Commercial Science Course is the first two years of the BSBA. Students are trained to become competent business associates in the future.

Bachelor of Science in Office Administration (BSOA) with a specialty in the field of Computer Teacher Education tailor the students to become competent computer-teachers with passion and compassion to their students and their work. The ladder of this course is the Two-Year Computer Secretarial Course. The course trains the students to become a competent secretary to fit-in in whatever field of work they will be connected.

The college also offers 5-Months Vocational Courses such as Dressmaking, Hairscience, Advance Dressmaking, Beauty Culture, Master's Men Tailoring, and Pre-Master's Men Tailoring. Together with some Special Vocational Courses in Stenography, Typewriting and Bookkeeping.

School activities
Every first week of October, the Cabalum Western College celebrates her Foundation Week for two main purposes: to let her students remember her humble beginnings and to develop their intra-personal and interpersonal capabilities. The event does not only display intelligence but also creativity, sportsmanship, and camaraderie. Each year, the college administration, the faculty and staff together with the student's body designed a new program to challenge everyone and to avoid stagnancy of the events.

Aside from ball games, odyssey of the minds and clashes of beauties and wit, the college decided to have a Facet of the Months, which make the students and their teachers to let their sweat of creativity out to have a remarkable presentation.

The college also allows her students to explore the outside world from campus. The graduating students go to Manila as part of their Educational Tour to subject them with the latest trends of Information Technology.

Basically, Cabalum Western College caters students to become more sociable, more humane and competent enough to join the work force of the world.

References

, Manila Bulletin, Philippines, added 18-June-2007
, IT Information, added 18-June-2007

Universities and colleges in Iloilo City